Arthur Samuel Brown (6 April 1885 – 27 June 1944) was an English international footballer who played as a forward.

Career
Brown played in the Football League for Gainsborough Trinity, Sheffield United, Sunderland, Fulham and Middlesbrough. Brown was capped on two occasions by the England national football team.

References

1885 births
1944 deaths
English footballers
England international footballers
Gainsborough Trinity F.C. players
Sheffield United F.C. players
Sunderland A.F.C. players
Fulham F.C. players
Middlesbrough F.C. players
English Football League players
First Division/Premier League top scorers
Association football forwards